Caristanius tripartitus is a species of snout moth in the genus Caristanius. It was described by Herbert H. Neunzig in 1996, and is known from the Dominican Republic.

The length of the forewings is 10–11 mm. The ground colour of the forewings is pale brown to brown, while the hindwings are pale fuscous.

References

Moths described in 1996
Phycitinae